Elachista agelensis is a moth of the family Elachistidae. It is found in France, Italy and the Czech Republic.

References

agelensis
Moths described in 1996
Moths of Europe